Filippo Reef is a reef that is asserted to be in the Pacific Ocean at ,  east of Starbuck Island in the Line Islands. The reef was reported by the master of the Italian barque Filippo as having been seen on 28 June 1886.

The only sighting referenced shows a date of 1926. It is therefore likely that this 1926 report is an error, and that Filippo Reef is a phantom island, and that therefore any maps showing it are relying on the 1926 report and are also in error.

Nevertheless, it is marked in the 2015 edition of the National Geographic Atlas of the World.

See also
 List of reefs

References
  

Line Islands
Reefs of the Pacific Ocean
Seamounts of the Pacific Ocean
Phantom islands
Reefs of Kiribati
Line Islands (Kiribati)